(born July 23, 1959) is a Japanese video game designer, director, and producer. He has worked at Nintendo since 1982. He has directed several games in the Metroid series. He is one of the most prominent members of Nintendo's former Research and Development 1 division, along with Gunpei Yokoi and Toru Osawa.

Career
Sakamoto is a key member in the development of the Metroid series. Sakamoto grew up with Nintendo toys, which he felt were inventive. The company hired him in 1982, when he graduated from art college. His first projects at Nintendo were the design of pixel art for the Game & Watch handheld Donkey Kong, and the arcade game Donkey Kong Jr. He turned to the Nintendo Entertainment System afterward, for which he designed the games Wrecking Crew, Balloon Fight and Gumshoe. Sakamoto also was the lead scenario writer and creator of Famicom Detective Club with its two entries, one of the most influential visual novel in Japan in the 80s. 

Sakamoto created characters for Metroid (under the alias 'Shikamoto'), and was a game designer on Kid Icarus. He also directed Super Metroid, Metroid Fusion, Metroid: Zero Mission, Metroid: Other M, and was the producer for Metroid: Samus Returns and Metroid Dread. Sakamoto's design work is also found in Nintendo games including Balloon Kid (1990), Game & Watch Gallery (1997), Wario Land 4 (2001), and WarioWare.

Philosophy
Sakamoto has stated that he wants to live up to public expectations of Nintendo to deliver products similarly unique to those of his youth, describing WarioWare, Inc. as an example. Regarding his professional relationship with Nintendo producer Shigeru Miyamoto, he believes his mission is not to compete with but to "always come up with something very different from what Mr. Miyamoto is likely to do".

Works

References

External links

 

1959 births
Japanese video game designers
Japanese video game directors
Living people
Metroid
Nintendo people
Video game writers